Pardon Us is a 1931 American pre-Code Laurel and Hardy film. It was the duo's first starring feature-length comedy film, produced by Hal Roach and Stan Laurel, directed by James Parrott, and originally distributed by Metro-Goldwyn-Mayer in 1931.

Plot
As with its predecessor, Blotto, the film is set during the Prohibition.

The film starts with Stan and Ollie listing ingredients outside "Malt and Hops", a shop selling ingredients for brewing. Ollie says he is going to make 15 gallons of beer and Stan says "we can't drink 15 gallons". Ollie replies "what we can't drink we will sell". The film then cuts to Laurel and Hardy arriving in handcuffs at prison for concocting and selling their own home brew. They become prisoners 44633 and 44634.

Stan's loose tooth gets him into trouble with the governor. As they are taken to their cell Stan says that two other inmates are Amos 'n' Andy.

They are put in cell 14 with five other prisoners including "The Tiger" (Walter Long), the roughest, toughest and meanest of all inmates. Stan has a loose tooth that causes him to emit a razzberry at the end of every sentence; the inmate interprets this as a coolly defiant attitude and is impressed—nobody else ever stood up to him like that. He and Stan become fast friends. Stan and Ollie have to share the top bunk as there are only six beds.

Laurel & Hardy attend prison school with James Finlayson as the teacher. The vaudeville routine that follows ends with an ink-soaked ball of paper, meant for somebody else, hitting the teacher, in the face and the boys wind up in solitary. There is a sustained scene of the bleak cells with the unseen boys conversing through the walls.

During a prison riot, the boys escape. A $500 dollar award appears on a wanted poster. They end on a cotton plantation, where they hide out undetected, in blackface. Ollie sings "Lazy Moon" while Stan dances. Stan falls in a pond and his blackface washes off. The prison warden drives by the plantation with his daughter and his car breaks down. When they attempt to repair the warden's car, they are discovered due to Stan's involuntary razzberry and are sent back to prison.

A warden decides to send Laurel to the prison dentist to have the offending tooth pulled. Ollie decides to sit with Stan in the second chair and accidentally gets his tooth pulled. When the dentist eventually pulls Stan's tooth he pulls the wrong one.

Tricked by a prison guard into breaking their alleged personal hunger strike, by being promised a thanksgiving-style feast, they go to the mess hall, only to be served the usual drab fare. Laurel protests the absence of the feast, but is threatened by the guards. Soon after, as guns are being passed around under the tables, the naively-puzzled Laurel cluelessly sets off the Tommy gun he has been passed and starts the planned riot prematurely. The Tiger tries to stab Stan for ruining the plan. The warden's daughter is trapped in a burning building and Stan and Ollie get ladders to rescue her. The ladder is too short and Ollie has to hold it high. Stan fires off the Tommy gun again and inadvertently breaks up the prison riot. The grateful warden issues them a written pardon. Laurel unintentionally "razzes" him (and naively solicits him for an order of beer when he misunderstands the warden telling them to "start all over again") and their exit from the prison is a very fast one.

Opening title card
H.M. Walker wrote the opening title card to this film, which states, "Mr. Hardy is a man of wonderful ideas—So is Mr. Laurel—As long as he doesn't try to think."

Cast

Production
After the release of MGM's hit The Big House with Chester Morris and Wallace Beery, producer Hal Roach decided to feature Laurel and Hardy in a two-reeler spoofing the current prison drama. Roach felt that since his product was currently being released through MGM, he would be able to borrow existing sets used in The Big House to keep costs down. MGM studio head Louis B. Mayer agreed to the idea, on the proviso that the duo appear in a film for MGM in the near future. Infuriated, Roach turned down the offer, and hired set designer Frank Durloff to build an exact replica of the needed prison sets.

Pardon Us began production as The Rap in June 1930. To Roach's dismay, shooting went over schedule, with enough surplus for two prison-themed films. As a result, it was decided that The Rap be released as a full-length feature film, Laurel and Hardy's first as stars. Previewed in August 1930, the film ran 70 minutes, and was subject to lukewarm reviews, in which critics stated that the movie needed a bit of tightening. Stan Laurel decided to withdraw Pardon Us from general distribution to add new scenes and delete unnecessary ones. Leroy Shield's musical score was added (many songs already appearing in Our Gang and Laurel and Hardy short films), and the film was eventually released on August 15, 1931, a year after its first preview.

June Marlowe (who was simultaneously appearing as school marm Miss Crabtree in the Our Gang series) appears only briefly in the film despite her receiving billing after Laurel and Hardy. An elaborate deleted sequence was filmed, in which the convicts set the prison on fire as part of their escape plan and the warden's daughter is seen screaming from her second floor bedroom.

Stan Laurel did not find this sequence satisfactory, and re-filmed the much simpler ending involving the boys holding the convicts at bay with a machine gun. In the released version, June Marlowe does not appear in this scene at all. However, she does appear in the Spanish version of Pardon Us, which was entitled De Bote en Bote ("From Cell to Cell"). This version still exists, with an alternate ending which shows Stan looking at their prison mugshots at the end, much to the disgust of Ollie, who rips them up. Pardon Us was released in the UK under the title Jailbirds.

Foreign-language versions

In the early days of sound films, it was common for Hollywood studios to produce "Foreign Language Versions" of their films using the same sets, costumes and so forth. While many of these versions no longer exist, the Spanish-language version of Pardon Us, which is entitled De Bote en Bote, is an exception.

Besides the Spanish version, an Italian version was filmed, entitled Muraglie ("Walls"). A German version was also filmed, entitled Hinter Schloss und Riegel ("Behind Lock and Bar"). The French version was entitled Sous Les Verrous ("Under the Locks"). Unfortunately, the French and Italian versions are now lost, but some parts of the German version were discovered in 1999 and are available on DVD.

Each foreign-language version was shot simultaneously with the English version, with the actors actually speaking the language. This was accomplished by employing actors who were fluent in their respective languages for smaller roles, with the major parts reserved for the American actors. These films were cunningly conceived, with language coaches reciting the lines and the mono-lingual performers writing their lines down phonetically on cue cards. These cue cards were just out of camera range, and it was not uncommon to see an actor glance off to the side for their next cue in the days before dubbing and re-recording, but it proved to be too expensive and time-consuming.

Laurel and Hardy were so popular that they proved to be irreplaceable. So Pardon Us, along with such shorts such as Blotto, Chickens Come Home, and Below Zero had a French and Spanish version. Laurel and Hardy spoke their lines phonetically, and many supporting roles were recast, including Boris Karloff playing "The Tiger" in the French version, before his fame in Frankenstein which premiered in November 1931.

Availability 
Three prints of different length are in circulation today. In the mid-1980s, 3M issued a series of L&H films on laserdisc and used the preview print of Pardon Us. It ran nine minutes longer than all previous prints, and contained additional scenes with the warden, solitary confinement, and second performance of "Hand Me Down My Silver Trumpet Gabriel". This version has been shown several times on the cable network American Movie Classics. The 64-minute version also aired on TCM's April Fools' Day salute to Laurel and Hardy.

In 2004, Universal Studios issued the complete 1930 preview version on DVD, which includes added scenes taken from preview copies. This version, running at 70 minutes, was also released in 2011 as part of Laurel and Hardy: The Essential Collection. Originally, a music score was not added to the lost segment. This was resolved by adding Shield's music cues recreated by The Beau Hunks, a Dutch revivalist music ensemble, on their 1994 CD The Beau Hunks Play the Original Little Rascals Music.

References

External links 

 
 
 
 
 

1931 films
1931 comedy films
1930s prison films
American black-and-white films
American prison comedy films
Films about prison escapes
Films directed by James Parrott
Films set in prison
Laurel and Hardy (film series)
Metro-Goldwyn-Mayer films
Films with screenplays by H. M. Walker
1930s English-language films
1930s American films